Edwin W. and Charlotte Clarke House is a historic home located at Oswego in Oswego County, New York.  It is a -story brick Italianate style residence built in 1857. Edwin W. and Charlotte Clarke were prominent abolitionists and it is believed that the house was a way station on the Underground Railroad.

It was listed on the National Register of Historic Places in 2002.

References

Houses on the National Register of Historic Places in New York (state)
Houses completed in 1857
Houses in Oswego County, New York
Houses on the Underground Railroad
National Register of Historic Places in Oswego County, New York
1857 establishments in New York (state)